Stalbe Parish is an administrative unit of Cēsis Municipality in the Vidzeme region of Latvia. The administrative center is Stalbe.

Towns, villages and settlements of Stalbe Parish 
 Stalbe
 Rozula

References 

Parishes of Latvia
Cēsis Municipality
Vidzeme